Alfred Rose may refer to:

Alfred Rose (singer) (1932–2003), Goan tiatrist
Alfred Rose (bishop) (1884–1971), Church of England bishop
Alfred Rosé (1902–1975), Austrian composer and conductor
Alfred Rose (cricketer) (1894–1985), English cricketer
Al Rose (1905–1985), American football tight end

See also 
 Albert Rose (disambiguation)
 Al Rosen (disambiguation)
 Elie Rous, French football manager
 Ali Roz, Lebanese columnist and commentator